Christianagaram is a village in Thoothukudi District in Tamil Nadu, India.

The Christianagaram District is situated between Moodaloor and the seacoast, where, about four and a half miles to the south-east, is the town of Manapaud, in which are the ruins of a Protestant church, which was built by the Dutch, when they had a small settlement there, with a factory, which has been long discontinued, and their dependants removed. The native inhabitants are almost all Romanists; and the place is celebrated as that in which the famous Tamil scholar, Beschi, died. Manapaud forms the boundary of my district in that direction.

External links
http://vicarstmarkschurch.in/udangudi/

Villages in Thoothukudi district